Gottlieb Wanzenried (2 September 1906 – 24 June 1993) was a Swiss cyclist. He competed in the individual and team road race events at the 1928 Summer Olympics.

References

External links
 

1906 births
1993 deaths
Swiss male cyclists
Olympic cyclists of Switzerland
Cyclists at the 1928 Summer Olympics
Cyclists from Bern